James Fryatt (2 September 1940 – 5 June 2020) was an English footballer who played as a striker. During his playing career he was nicknamed Pancho.

Football League
A regular scorer for all of his club sides, the stockily built forward was the archetypal journeyman, spending most of his career switching between lower league sides. However whilst appearing for Bradford Park Avenue against Tranmere Rovers on 25 April 1964 Fryatt established a Football League record by scoring after only 4 seconds, the fastest goal in the competition's history. Fryatt was well regarded for his time at Stockport County, where his strike partnership with Bill Atkins was so formidable that the two have been inducted into the club's Hall of Fame as a unit. Fryatt signed for Oldham Athletic from Blackburn Rovers for a sum of £8,000 in 1970 and although he only spent 21 months at Boundary Park, he became an instant hit and legend among supporters for scoring 42 goals in 81 appearances in all competitions.

NASL
Like many of his contemporaries Fryatt appeared in the North American Soccer League during the summer months, first appearing in the 1973 season with the title winning Philadelphia Atoms, for whom he scored in the play-offs against Toronto Metros. He returned to the club the following year before finishing his career in the 1975 season initially with Hartford Bicentennials and then back in Philadelphia.

Post-retirement
After retiring as a player, Fryatt served briefly as the assistant manager of the original Las Vegas Quicksilvers before settling permanently in Las Vegas where he worked at casinos before becoming a mechanic for a golf course. He was the father of professional golfer Ed Fryatt. He died 5 June 2020 in Las Vegas.

References

External links
 NASL stats

1940 births
2020 deaths
English footballers
English football managers
Charlton Athletic F.C. players
Southend United F.C. players
Bradford (Park Avenue) A.F.C. players
Southport F.C. players
Torquay United F.C. players
Stockport County F.C. players
Blackburn Rovers F.C. players
Oldham Athletic A.F.C. players
English Football League players
Footballers from Southampton
Philadelphia Atoms players
Connecticut Bicentennials players
North American Soccer League (1968–1984) players
Expatriate soccer players in the United States
English expatriate footballers
North American Soccer League (1968–1984) coaches
Association football forwards
English expatriate sportspeople in the United States
English emigrants to the United States